Antonia Hugh is a Jamaican businessman and diplomat currently serving as Jamaica ambassador to China.

Education 
Hugh attended Brigham Young University, United States where obtained a bachelor’s degree in Business Administration before proceeding to University of the West Indies where he earned a master’s degree in Business Administration.

Career 
Hugh is an international business consultant with interest in energy and property development. He was Director of Rayton Group Limited, Jamaica and Non-Executive Director, AMG packaging and Paper Ltd. Jamaica. He was appointed Jamaica ambassador to China in 2019.

References 

Jamaican diplomats
Jamaican businesspeople
Brigham Young University alumni
University of the West Indies alumni
Year of birth missing (living people)
Living people